Gordon "Gio" Reid  (born 2 October 1991) is a British professional wheelchair tennis player. He is ranked world No. 4 in singles and world No. 1 in doubles. He is a Paralympic gold, silver, and bronze medalist, two-time Grand Slam singles champion, and nineteen-time Grand Slam doubles champion.

He has competed for Great Britain at the Summer Paralympics when tennis made its first appearance at Beijing 2008. He reached the quarterfinals in the singles in London 2012 as well as the quarterfinals in doubles. He won Paralympic gold in the men's singles event at Rio 2016 and silver in the doubles event with partner Alfie Hewett, whom he beat in the singles final. At Tokyo 2020, Reid won bronze in the singles and silver in the doubles with Hewett. The pair later went on to complete a calendar year Grand Slam, winning all four majors in 2021. They are currently on a run of 13 consecutive grand slam final appearances, during which they won 10 slams in a row.

Early life
Reid was born in Alexandria, West Dunbartonshire, on 2 October 1991. He comes from a tennis-playing family and started playing tennis at the age of six, alongside his two brothers and sister at Helensburgh Lawn Tennis Club, where he was a good junior player, before contracting rare spinal condition, transverse myelitis in 2004. He was paralysed from the waist down for over a decade but then gradually regained limited ability to stand and walk unaided.

He first began playing wheelchair tennis in 2005, when he was introduced to the sport at Scotstoun Leisure Centre in Glasgow. He was acknowledged for his sporting credentials in 2006, when he was among the 10 shortlisted finalists for the BBC Young Sports Personality of the Year.

In 2007, Reid became Britain's youngest men's Singles National Champion and he was also part of Great Britain's winning junior team at the 2007 World Team Cup. He feels his greatest achievement was representing ParalympicsGB at the 2008 Beijing Paralympic Games when he was 16 years old.

When he was younger, Reid combined his training commitments with his studies and in 2009 he passed Highers in Maths, English and Biology after attending Hermitage Academy. He is a lifelong supporter of Rangers FC and regularly attends their home matches.

Tennis career

Reid won his first wheelchair tennis title in April 2005, six weeks after coming out of hospital, when he won the B Division Singles at the Glasgow Wheelchair Tennis Tournament. He became Britain's youngest National champion at the age of 15 in 2007 and the youngest British men's No 1 shortly before his 18th birthday at the end of September 2008.

At the 2006 British Open he won both the Men's Second Draw Singles and Boys' Junior Singles and ended the year among the 10 shortlisted finalists for the 2006 BBC Young Sports Person of the Year.

In 2007 he won the boys' doubles at the Junior Masters in Tarbes, France and shortly afterwards won the men's singles at the 2007 North West Challenge in Preston to collect his first senior international NEC Wheelchair Tennis Tour singles title.  He was undefeated as a member of the winning GB Junior team in the Junior event at the 2007 Invacare World Team Cup (Davis and Fed Cups of wheelchair tennis)
In 2008 and 2009 he won both the boys' singles and boys' doubles at the Junior Masters in Tarbes, France and in January 2009 became world No 1 junior in the boys' singles rankings, a position he maintained throughout his final season as a junior. He helped Great Britain to win men's World Group 2 at the 2008 Invacare World Team Cup, to finish fifth in World Group 1 in 2009 and to finish fourth in Turkey in 2010, which was Britain's best Invacare World Team Cup result in the men's event since 2002.

Reid was named Tennis Scotland Junior Male Player of the Year in 2009 and Tennis Scotland Disabled Player of the Year in 2010.
As a doubles player, he qualified for the year-end Doubles Masters for the first time in 2009, where he and his Hungarian partner Laszlo Farkas finished fifth of the eight partnerships. Reid also played in the men's wheelchair doubles at Wimbledon in 2008.

Reid ended 2010 having beaten three world top ranked players on his way to winning three NEC Tour singles titles during the season, as well as winning four doubles titles during the year. He beat Austrian world No 9 Martin Legner to win his last tournament of the season in December, the Prague Cup Czech Indoor.

In January 2016 Reid won his first ever Grand Slam singles wheelchair title at the Australian Open. In July 2016, Reid followed up with his second Grand Slam victory in the inaugural singles wheelchair championships at Wimbledon. At the 2016 Summer Paralympics Reid won the gold medal for the Men's Wheel chair Singles tennis, beating fellow Briton Alfie Hewett in straight sets, 6–2, 6–1.

Reid was appointed Member of the Order of the British Empire (MBE) in the 2017 New Year Honours for services to wheelchair tennis. After giving him his MBE, Queen Elizabeth II referred to him as a "charming young man".

He competed in wheelchair tennis at the 2020 Summer Paralympics, where he won silver in the doubles with partner Alfie Hewett and bronze in the singles.

After 2016, Reid's grand slam success continued primarily with his accolades in the doubles alongside partner Alfie Hewett. Together, they were the first men's wheelchair tennis pair to win the calendar year grand slam, which they completed in 2021. Their title at the Australian Open in 2022 marked their 9th consecutive victory in a slam, overtaking Martina Navratilova and Pam Shriver's record for most consecutive slam titles. Their slam win streak is currently ongoing, having not lost in a slam since Wimbledon 2019.

Career statistics

Grand Slam performance timelines

Wheelchair singles

Wheelchair doubles

Finals

Wheelchair singles: 6 (2 titles, 4 runner-ups)

Wheelchair doubles: 27 (18 titles, 9 runner-ups)

References

External links
 
 
 
 
 
 

1991 births
Living people
People with paraplegia
Australian Open (tennis) champions
Wimbledon champions
US Open (tennis) champions
Scottish male tennis players
Scottish disabled sportspeople
Scottish Paralympic competitors
British male tennis players
British wheelchair tennis players
Paralympic wheelchair tennis players of Great Britain
Paralympic medalists in wheelchair tennis
Paralympic gold medalists for Great Britain
Paralympic silver medalists for Great Britain
Wheelchair tennis players at the 2008 Summer Paralympics
Wheelchair tennis players at the 2012 Summer Paralympics
Wheelchair tennis players at the 2016 Summer Paralympics
Wheelchair tennis players at the 2020 Summer Paralympics
Medalists at the 2016 Summer Paralympics
Members of the Order of the British Empire
Sportspeople from West Dunbartonshire
People educated at Hermitage Academy
ITF World Champions